Sleepwell Deconstructor is the first album by Trap Them, released on April 3, 2007 on Trash Art!. Like the last recorded output from core members Ryan McKenney and Brian Izzi, Backstabbers Inc's Kamikaze Missions (2003), Sleepwell Deconstructor is produced by Kurt Ballou. Illustration and design by Justin Bartlett.

Track listing

Reception

Sleepwell Deconstructor has received mainly positive reviews, from many critics. Exclaim! magazine called the band "one of the fiercest, ugliest, most threatening malcontents around". Decibel talked about the mix of styles on the album and were not quite sure what to make of it (though they did give a positive review). Despite some minor criticisms, Sleepwell Deconstructor was well-received for a debut album released on a small label with less reach than other indies. The album was also rated as one of Decibel'''s top 40 releases of 2007.

Music

ProductionSleepwell Deconstructor'' was produced by Trap Them and Kurt Ballou, Ballou also appears as a vocalist and guitarist on several songs.

References

External links
Interview/Review - Nashua Telegraph

2007 albums
Trap Them albums
Trash Art! albums
Albums produced by Kurt Ballou